'Kidd's Orange Red' is a cultivar of domesticated apple that originated in New Zealand. It is also known as the 'Delco' apple. It is a parent of 'Gala' and 'Telstar' apple cultivars. The 'Captain Kidd' apple is a sport from 'Kidd's Orange Red' with fruit that have a stronger red pigment.

References

Apple cultivars
New Zealand apples